Yaseinn Taher is a Yemeni-American who grew up in the suburbs of Buffalo, New York. In 2002, he was arrested and charged under Title 18 of the US Code, together with the other members of the "Lackawanna Six", based on the fact the group of friends had attended an Afghan training camp together years earlier.

Early life and education
The Taher household was not considered devoutly Muslim, although they forbade their children to date, they also exchanged gifts for Christmas and weren't "regulars" at mosque worship services.

Taher was captain of the Lackawanna Steelers soccer team, and dated the cheerleader Nicole Frick, whose Catholic parents approved of him since he seemed "more white" than most Muslim-Americans living in the area.

At his 1996 graduation, he was voted "friendliest" person of the graduating class. He attended community college, while working odd jobs and living with his parents. 

His maternal uncle, Abdulsalam Noman, was a Lackawanna City Council member and soccer coach at Lackawanna High School.  Noman largely dealt with media outlets when the Buffalo Six were discovered.

Marriage 
In 1998, when Nicole informed him she was pregnant, the 18-year-old Taher arranged a hasty Islamic wedding in his parents' living room.

Since Catholicism and Islam both allowed the marriage, on the basis that any children born to the union must be raised in their faith, Nicole and Taher argued over whether to raise "Noah" in the Catholic or Muslim faith. Taher subsequently became more religious, and began attending communal prayers every day, and discouraged provocative clothing and television. Nicole ostensibly converted to Islam after the birth of Noah, but still fought with Taher for increasing secularism.

Meetings with jihadists 
Like his friends, Taher began attending regular get-togethers at the Wilkes Barre apartment of Kamal Derwish, who had also grown up in the area, but had traveled overseas and spoke of fighting with the insurgency in Palestine and encouraged the friends to consider a Muslim's duty to defend the weak and innocent. At one point, he disagreed with Derwish, noting that although jihad may be the correct path in Muslim nations attacked by outsiders, he could not support something like the USS Cole bombing which took place in Yemen, a country that had not been invaded.

Afghanistan 
Taher and six others traveled to Al Farooq training camp in Afghanistan in the spring and summer of 2001,  weeks before the September 11, 2001 terrorist attacks.

Return to USA 
Six of the seven returned to the US including Taher, Moseb and Galeb. They decided to leave together after Sahim Alwan made it clear he wanted to return home and was unhappy with the tone of the camp. They were driven to Quetta, and rather than wait a day for the next plane, took a bus to Karachi so they could leave Pakistan immediately. During questioning upon their return four of the six men said they were coming back to the US from attending religious seminars in Pakistan. None mentioned the trip to Pakistan until Mukhtar al-Bakri was arrested in Bahrain and questioned by FBI agents on September 11, 2002.

Kidnapping 
In September 2003 two men, Brett Bigalow and Timothy Fisher, were arrested and charged with extortion for kidnapping a man. The kidnappers demanded a $1 million ransom from a close relative of Taher, who subsequently contacted police after receiving the demand for ransom. The victim said his captors wanted to know where a seventh Lackawanna man- Jaber Elbaneh, was hiding. Elbaneh was a suspected terrorist whose whereabouts were sought by international police offering a $5 million reward if his location was revealed.

Arrest
Five of the Lackawanna Six men were arrested in September 2002 and held in a federal detention center after several FBI raids in the Buffalo, New York suburb of Lackawanna. The five were Yahya Goba, Sahim Alwan, Shafal Mosed, Yasein Taher, and Faysal Galab. Mukhtar al-Bakri was arrested in Bahrain, brought to the US and charged with providing material support to designated foreign terrorist organizations, known as Title 18 of the US Code. The others were charged with the same violation of US law.

Trial
In December 2003 Taher was sentenced to eight years in prison for supporting a terrorist organization. Taher, who was 25 years old at the time, pleaded guilty, admitting to attending the Farooq training camp run by Al Qaeda in the months leading up to the September 11 attacks. Taher and the other men admitted to training with weapons and explosives and doing guard duty at the camp. Each guilty plea could lead to a maximum ten-year sentence, but Taher's sentence was reduced for cooperating with federal officials, and for presenting letters of support from family members, as well as showing remorse.

References

American people imprisoned on charges of terrorism
Buffalo Six
Living people
People from Lackawanna, New York
Year of birth missing (living people)